Melbourne Anime Festival, colloquially known as "Manifest", was a three-day fan convention held in Melbourne, Australia. It focused on the art of anime and manga, East Asian culture, and its associated fandoms. Manifest was held at the Parkville campus of the University of Melbourne until 2009, when it moved to the Melbourne Showgrounds. It was held in August each year. Following the 2013 convention, Manifest closed.

Manifest was run by the not-for-profit organisation MAFI (Melbourne Anime Festival Inc.) and staffed entirely by volunteers. The organising committee held regular meetings to plan and organise the event, and was made up of 30-75 people. In addition, more than a hundred individuals volunteered their time on the event weekend to help run the convention.

History
Manifest was originally held at the University of Melbourne until 2009, when it moved to the Melbourne Showgrounds. On 1 December 2013, it was announced that Manifest would not be running again in 2014 due to financial and staffing issues.

Event history

See also
 List of anime conventions

References

External links
 Manifest official Facebook page
 Manifest official twitter page

Conventions in Australia
Defunct anime conventions
Recurring events established in 2000
Recurring events disestablished in 2013